Two of a Kind is a 1982 TV movie featuring George Burns as the grandfather of a 21-year-old man with an intellectual disability played by Robby Benson.

Cast
 George Burns as Ross 'Boppy' Minor
 Robby Benson as Noel 'Nolie' Minor
 Barbara Barrie as Dottie Minor
 Cliff Robertson as Frank Minor
 Frances Lee McCain as Nurse Mary
 Geri Jewell as Irene
 Ronny Cox as Ted Hahn
 Peggy McCay as Nurse Harris
 Justin Lord as Phelps

Reception
The Commercial Appeal of Memphis, TN called Benson's performance an "acting achievement of the first order."

Accolades
 Humanitas Award: Roger Young, director
 Golden Globes Nomination, Best Performance by an Actor in a Miniseries or Motion Picture Made for Television: Robbie Benson

References

External links 
 
 

1982 films
1982 television films
1982 drama films
CBS network films
1980s English-language films
Films directed by Roger Young